Mario Teaches Typing is an educational video game developed and published by Interplay for MS-DOS compatible operating systems, Microsoft Windows, and Macintosh. The game uses the Mario character, licensed from Nintendo, to teach keyboard skills.

Gameplay
Mario Teaches Typing includes three selectable characters: Mario, Luigi and Princess Peach. The game displays two pairs of hands which show which finger to use; for example, if the player has to type "A", the leftmost finger is highlighted. If the player makes an error, the cursor does not advance until they enter the correct key. After time ends, the exercise ends and a chalkboard screen appears, displaying statistics on how well the player performed, including words per minute.

Beyond lessons, there are three levels of varying difficulty based on the assets of Super Mario World; a platform game, the player types on the keyboard to have Mario progress through the level, avoiding obstacles and enemies to reach the end. The first level has the player locate and press the right keys on the keyboard to move, the second level requires typing words, and the third level full sentences.

Development and release
 

Mario Teaches Typing was conceived and developed by Brian Fargo, head of the video game company Interplay Entertainment. Fargo was acquaintances with Les Crane, a talk show host and radio announcer, who had also developed the educational typing game Mavis Beacon Teaches Typing. The game was successful, and inspired Fargo to create a typing game of his own. Considering who could be the face and teacher of the game, he found Mario to be a good fit. Pitching the game to Nintendo, according to Fargo "they loved it and it was a huge success." The CD-ROM version of the game was produced by Thomas R. Decker, a producer for Interplay whose past titles included Mario's Game Gallery and Kingdom: the Far Reaches. The game was released in the United States in 1992 and in the United Kingdom in 1993. Mario Teaches Typing was the first game by Nintendo that released for hardware outside of their own. 

Fargo told IGN in an interview that when he attended Crane's talk show after the game's release, he saw that Crane was "giving me the stink eye". He called Crane afterward, who expressed disapproval of Mario Teaches Typing; the game was successful enough to become a direct competitor to Mavis Beacon Teaches Typing. According to Fargo, "somebody else came out with some other Mario product that was not high quality" for computers, resulting in Nintendo cutting ties with Interplay Entertainment.

In the CD version, Mario was voiced by Charles Martinet, which would be among his first times using the voice for a Mario video game. He also performed the motions and expressions for the character through virtual actor tracking sensors. Martinet considered  Mario Teaches Typing to be one of his favorite projects using the voice, as well as one of the most important; it helped him understand the character from a child's perspective. He declared that Mario would never be in a negative headspace, and when he saw the script containing  criticism for failing, such as "Oh that wasn't very good, try again," he insisted the dialogue encourage the user to continue trying, such as, "Not as good this time, but you're gonna do it better this time, let's go!'"

Reception

The game sold more than 800,000 copies.

Steve Fountain of the Evening Sentinel reviewed the Windows version, stating "Mario Teaches Typing is less fun than a normal computer game, but a whole lot better than ploughing through a dull typing manual"

A sequel to the game, Mario Teaches Typing 2, was developed by Brainstorm and published by Interplay in 1997.

References

Mario educational games
1992 video games
Interplay Entertainment games
Typing software
Classic Mac OS games
DOS games
Windows games
Video games developed in the United States
Single-player video games